Cesare Mezzogori (Active 1660s-1689) was an Italian painter, active in a Baroque style.

He was born in Comacchio, and likely trained as well as active in Ferrara. He often painted for the Theatine order.
He painted a Virgin of the Rosary with the Saints Domenico and Giustina for the Church of Santa Maria del Rosario in Comacchio.

References

17th-century Italian painters
Italian male painters
Painters from Ferrara
Year of birth unknown
1689 deaths